The Avia B.158 was a prototype Czechoslovak twin-engined light bomber aircraft of the 1930s.  Only a single example was built and it was abandoned, following the German occupation of Czechoslovakia in March 1939.

Development and design
In 1935, the Czech aircraft company Avia produced the B-58 design for a small twin-engined bomber with a fixed undercarriage, powered by two 313 kW (420 hp) Avia Rk.17 radial engines.  This design was abandoned in 1936 and replaced by a more powerful and advanced derivative, the Avia B.158, which was designed to meet a requirement from the Czechoslovak Ministry of National Defense (MNO) for a high performance medium bomber, capable of operation during both day and night, and competing against Aero Vodochody's A.300.

In 1937, Avia started to build a single prototype of the B-158, a three-seat low-winged  monoplane with inverted gull-wings, a retractable tailwheel undercarriage and 634 kW (850 hp) Avia (Hispano-Suiza) 12Ydrs engines, making its maiden flight in mid-1938. It was fitted with a twin-tail to give a better field of fire for the dorsal gun position.

While the competing Aero A.300 gave superior performance, neither had entered into production by the time Germany completed its conquest of Czechoslovakia. After testing by the Luftwaffe at their test centre at Rechlin, the prototype B-158 was scrapped in 1940.

Specifications (B.158)

See also

References
Notes

Bibliography

 "Plane Facts: One-off Czech". Air International, January 1981, Vol 20 No. 1. p. 48.

External links

AVIA B-158 (In Czech)

Low-wing aircraft
Gull-wing aircraft
1930s Czechoslovakian bomber aircraft
B-158
Aircraft first flown in 1938
Twin piston-engined tractor aircraft